The 1947 Penn Quakers football team was an American football team that represented the University of Pennsylvania during the 1947 college football season. In its tenth season under head coach George Munger, the team compiled a 7–0–1 record, outscored opponents by a total of 219 to 35, and was ranked No. 7 in the final AP Poll. The team's lone setback was a 7–7 tie with Army.

Munger was Penn's head coach for 16 years; he was inducted into the College Football Hall of Fame in 1976. In addition, three players from the 1947 team were inducted into the College Football Hall of Fame: center/linebacker Chuck Bednarik; tackle George Savitsky; and halfback Skip Minisi. Bednarik was a consensus first-team All-American; he also finished seventh in the 1947 voting for the Heisman Trophy.

Schedule

References

Penn
Penn Quakers football seasons
College football undefeated seasons
Penn Quakers football